Felimida goslineri is a species of colourful sea slug, a dorid nudibranch, a marine gastropod mollusk in the family Chromodorididae.

Distribution
This species occurs in the Atlantic Ocean off the Azores.

References

 Ortea, J., Valdés, Á. & García-Gómez, J.C. (1996). Revisión de las especies atlánticas de la familia Chromodorididae (Mollusca: Nudibranchia) del grupo cromático azul. Avicennia suplemento 1: 1-165 page(s): 143
 Gofas, S.; Le Renard, J.; Bouchet, P. (2001). Mollusca, in: Costello, M.J. et al. (Ed.) (2001). European register of marine species: a check-list of the marine species in Europe and a bibliography of guides to their identification. Collection Patrimoines Naturels, 50: pp. 180–213
 Johnson R.F. & Gosliner T.M. (2012) Traditional taxonomic groupings mask evolutionary history: A molecular phylogeny and new classification of the chromodorid nudibranchs. PLoS ONE 7(4): e33479

Chromodorididae
Gastropods described in 1996